The 2000 Rhein Fire season was the sixth season for the franchise in the NFL Europe League (NFLEL). The team was led by head coach Galen Hall in his sixth year, and played its home games at Rheinstadion in Düsseldorf, Germany. They finished the regular season in first place with a record of seven wins and three losses, qualifying for the league final for the third time in four years. Rhein won the second championship in team history by defeating the Scottish Claymores 13–10 in World Bowl 2000.

Offseason

Free agent draft

Personnel

Staff

Roster

Schedule

Standings

Game summaries

World Bowl 2000

Notes

References

Rhein
Rhein Fire seasons
Rhein
Rhein